Spiritus (Latin for "spirit" or "breathing"), may refer to:
Spiritus lenis, the "soft breathing" in Byzantine Greek orthography
Spiritus asper, the "hard breathing" in Byzantine Greek orthography
Spiritus (journal), an academic journal devoted to the study of Christian spirituality
Spiritus (novel), a 1996 novel by Ismail Kadare
 Spiritus (EP) an extended play by Australian singer songwriter, Lisa Mitchell, 2012
 "Spiritus" (song) a single by Lisa Mitchell from the 2012 EP